Mary Lucy "Marilu" Denise Henner (born April 6, 1952) is an American actress. She began her career appearing in the original production of the musical Grease in 1971, before making her screen debut in the 1977 comedy-drama film Between the Lines. In 1977, Henner was cast in her breakthrough role as Elaine O'Connor Nardo in the ABC/NBC sitcom Taxi, a role she played until 1983 and received five Golden Globe Award nominations. She later had co-starring roles in films such as Hammett (1982), The Man Who Loved Women (1983), Cannonball Run II (1984), Johnny Dangerously (1984), Rustlers' Rhapsody (1985), Ladykillers (1988), L.A. Story (1991), and Noises Off (1992). She returned to television with a starring role in the CBS sitcom Evening Shade (1990–1994), and later had leading roles in many made-for-television movies.

Early life
Henner was born in Chicago, Illinois, the daughter of Loretta Callis (born Nikoleta Kalogeropoulos), who died of complications of arthritis at age 58 and Joseph Henner (whose surname was originally Pudlowski), who died of a heart attack at age 52.

Career
While a student at the University of Chicago in the Hyde Park neighborhood of Chicago, Henner originated the role of "Marty" in the Kingston Mines production of Grease in 1971. When the show was discovered and moved to Broadway, she was asked to reprise the role; however, she chose instead to play "Marty" in the national touring company alongside John Travolta, who played "Doody". Additional Broadway credits for Henner include Over Here!, with Travolta, revivals of Pal Joey, Chicago, Social Security, and The Tale of the Allergist's Wife. Her first film appearance was in 1977 sleeper-hit Between the Lines, co-starring then-unknowns Jeff Goldblum, Lindsay Crouse, John Heard, and Jill Eikenberry. Her second role was opposite Richard Gere in the 1978 film Bloodbrothers.

Henner came to prominence with the role of Elaine Nardo in the situation comedy Taxi, portraying a single mother working as a cabbie who aspired to be an artist. She was the leading lady in the 1982 film Hammett directed by Wim Wenders, produced by Francis Ford Coppola and starring her first husband Frederic Forrest. In 1983, Henner starred opposite Burt Reynolds in The Man Who Loved Women, directed by Blake Edwards. Reynolds then asked Henner to join the cast of Cannonball Run II later that year along with Shirley MacLaine and Dom DeLuise. She was the leading lady in the 1984 film Johnny Dangerously, playing the love interest to Michael Keaton. In 1985 she once again appeared alongside John Travolta in Perfect.  In 1991 she appeared opposite Steve Martin in L.A. Story as Trudi, a role for which she received a nomination for an American Comedy Award as the Funniest Supporting Female in a Motion Picture. From 1990 through 1994, she appeared opposite Burt Reynolds in the situation comedy Evening Shade, which also starred Ossie Davis and Hal Holbrook. She also appeared in Noises Off (1992) and in Man on the Moon (1999), a film about her Taxi co-star Andy Kaufman. Henner played herself (as well as herself playing her Taxi character).

Henner guested on Match Game and Hollywood Squares. She provided the voice for Gotham City socialite Veronica Vreeland in Batman: The Animated Series (1992–1999), reprising the role in the animated films Batman: Mask of the Phantasm (1993) and Batman & Mr. Freeze: SubZero (1998). In 1994, she hosted her own daytime talk show, Marilu, for 165 episodes.

Henner starred as the domineering mother of the bride in the Brooks & Dunn video "You Can't Take the Honky Tonk Out of the Girl" in 2003.

In 2006 and 2007, Henner was the host of the television series America's Ballroom Challenge. Henner said on an episode of The Ellen DeGeneres Show, in early 2008, that she has never actually danced ballroom and would like to go on a season of Dancing with the Stars, which would later come true in 2016 for the season 23 of Dancing with the Stars. She later hosted FitTV and The Discovery Channel's Shape Up Your Life, which is based on her books.

Henner was a contestant on NBC's first The Celebrity Apprentice, in 2008. She was fired by Donald Trump in the eighth episode but was brought back to help fellow contestant Trace Adkins in the final task of the show.

Henner, who has highly superior autobiographical memory, was a consultant for the CBS drama  Unforgettable, which starred Poppy Montgomery as Carrie Wells, a woman with the same ability. Henner guest-starred as Carrie's aunt.

In August 2012, Henner won $25,000 for the charity Physicians Committee for Responsible Medicine (PCRM) as a celebrity contestant on Live! with Kelly "Grilling with the Stars" contest for her Healthy/Easy Grilled Mushroom and Heirloom Tomato dish.Henner has written nine books on diet, health and memory, the most prominent being Total Health Makeover, in which she explains the virtues of a non-dairy diet in conjunction with food combining and exercise. She leads monthly classes on her website, www.marilu.com, designed to help people integrate these steps into a healthier, more active lifestyle. Both of her parents died in their 50s, which prompted her to lead a healthier lifestyle. She hosted The Art of Living, produced by United States Media Television. 

Henner rejoined the cast for its 13th season on The All-Star Celebrity Apprentice where she was joined by fellow Apprentice alumni. She played for her charity The Alzheimer's Association and won over $50,000 for the cause. She returned, after being eliminated, for the final task to assist Trace Adkins. In 2013, Henner made a guest appearance on Brooklyn Nine-Nine for 5 episodes.

She hosts The Marilu Henner Show, which airs every weekday morning on more than a dozen radio stations across the U.S. The show is distributed by Sun Broadcast Group, in conjunction with GCN radio. The Marilu Henner Show can also be heard live at Marilushow.com, where she features guest physicians, health experts, celebrity guests, and friends.

On August 30, 2016, she was revealed as one of the celebrities who would compete on season 23 of Dancing with the Stars. She was partnered with professional dancer Derek Hough. Henner and Hough were eliminated on the ninth week of competition and finished in sixth place.

On July 10, 2018, she appeared as a "guestpert" on the podcast My Brother, My Brother and Me. In 2018, Henner appeared on the first season of The Neighborhood, a CBS series starring Cedric the Entertainer, Tichina Arnold and Beth Behrs. Henner appeared in episode 8 of the first season titled, “Welcome to Thanksgiving”.

Personal life
Henner has hyperthymesia or total recall memory; she can remember specific details of virtually every day of her life since she was a child.

Filmography

Film

Television

Published books
 By All Means Keep On Moving (September 5, 1994)
 Marilu Henner's Total Health Makeover (May 6, 1998)
 The 30-Day Total Health Makeover (March 3, 1999)
 I Refuse To Raise A Brat (October 12, 1999)
 Healthy Life Kitchen (July 10, 2000)
 Healthy Kids: Help Them Eat Smart and Stay Active-For Life! (August 7, 2001)
 Healthy Holidays (Oct 1, 2002)
 Wear Your Life Well: Use What You Have To Get What You Want (April 8, 2008)
 Total Memory Makeover: Uncover Your Past, Take Charge of Your Future (April 24, 2012)

References

External links

Living people
Actresses from Chicago
American film actresses
American memoirists
American musical theatre actresses
American television actresses
Television producers from Illinois
American women television producers
American voice actresses
Participants in American reality television series
University of Chicago alumni
American writers of Greek descent
American people of Polish descent
American women memoirists
20th-century American non-fiction writers
20th-century American women writers
21st-century American non-fiction writers
21st-century American women writers
The Apprentice (franchise) contestants
1952 births